The R320 is a Regional Route in South Africa that connects Onrusrivier near Hermanus with Caledon. The road is tarred over its full length, including through Shaw's Pass. 

Its southern origin is the R43 at Onrusrivier, between Hawston and Hermanus. It heads north-east through Shaw's Mountain Pass to end at the R316 at Caledon.

References

External links
 Routes Travel Info
 Shaw's Mountain Pass

Regional Routes in the Western Cape